Vadim Viktorovich Tolstolutsky (born in Kyrgyzstan) is a Kyrgyzstani retired footballer.

Career

In 1994, Tolstolutsky parents moved to the United States so that he would have a better chance of playing in college and professionally, settling in Vancouver, Washington. He graduated from Fort Vancouver High School in 1997 and later played for Seattle Pacific University.

In 2001, he was American third division side Portland Timbers's first draft pick. Of Tolstolutsky, then coach Bobby Howe said he probably would not make had he stayed in Kyrgyzstan, because of former Soviet states' tendency to select certain players for development before age 22.

He has been coaching youth teams in Washington state since 2003.

Personal life
He married Paige Laurel Switzer in 2004.

References

External links
 Vadim Tolstolutsky at SoccerStats.us

Living people
Kyrgyzstani footballers
Kyrgyzstan youth international footballers
Association football midfielders
Portland Timbers (2001–2010) players
A-League (1995–2004) players
Kyrgyzstani emigrants to the United States
Soccer players from Washington (state)
Sportspeople from Vancouver, Washington
Seattle Pacific Falcons men's soccer players
Year of birth missing (living people)